is a 2001–2002 Japanese animated television series based on Akira Kurosawa's chanbara film Yojimbo. It was directed by Hayato Date.

The series follows George Kodama into the small town of Kimujuku. The wanderer quickly realizes he is an unwelcomed visitor and becomes caught up in a violent conflict between rival crime syndicates.

Kaze no Yojimbo aired on Nippon Television from 2 October 2001 to 19 March 2002, totaling 25 episodes.

Plot 
Jyouji "George" Kodama arrives in the town of Kimujuku in search of a man named Genzo Araki. Unable to find him, he learns that the town is divided in two distinct factions. Sensing that Kimujuku's residents are hiding something, Jyouji takes work from each faction, playing them against each other in an effort to uncover the secret and the whereabouts of Genzo.

Episode list

References

External links 
 

2001 anime television series debuts
Adaptations of works by Akira Kurosawa
Bandai Entertainment anime titles
Pierrot (company)